Jerusalén is a municipality in the La Paz department of El Salvador. It was founded by the Cordova family. They were Sephardi Jews who were expelled from Spain. It has a population of 3000

See also 
 Jerusalén, Cundinamarca

Municipalities of the La Paz Department (El Salvador)